Nikola Malbaša (Serbian Cyrillic: Никола Малбаша; born 12 September 1977) is a Serbian former international footballer.

Statistics

Honours
Partizan
 First League of Serbia and Montenegro (1): 2002–03

External links
 Reprezentacija profile

1977 births
Living people
Footballers from Belgrade
Serbian footballers
Serbian expatriate footballers
Serbia and Montenegro international footballers
Association football defenders
FK Mladost Apatin players
FK Hajduk Kula players
FK Partizan players
AEK Athens F.C. players
TuS Koblenz players
Shandong Taishan F.C. players
Chinese Super League players
Expatriate footballers in Greece
Serbia and Montenegro expatriates in Greece
Expatriate footballers in Germany
Serbian expatriate sportspeople in Germany
Expatriate footballers in China
Serbian expatriate sportspeople in China
Serbia and Montenegro footballers